Paracoenia fumosa is a species of fly in the family Ephydridae. It is found in the  Palearctic.
Jizz Nervure Rf with 1-3 hairs. Abdomen: tergites with transverse grey green bands. Long. : 3,5 mm. May to October. By ponds.

References

External links
Images representing Paracoenia fumosa at BOLD

Ephydridae
Insects described in 1844
Diptera of Europe
Taxa named by Christian Stenhammar